Grading system in Morocco is mostly a 20-point grading scale, it is used in secondary schools as well as in universities.

Most of the time, the formal grades used in Morocco are not considered in graduate programs acceptance for some misunderstanding reasons: for instance, a grade of 12 (which is actually a passable grade in Morocco but equivalent to 60% in the US where it is considered a below-average) is generally a good starting grade to apply for graduate studies and financial aids or scholarships.

But some European universities use a different admission requirement for Moroccan students. Morocco's neighboring countries, Algeria and Tunisia, have a very similar grading system.

Grading system
The Moroccan grading system ranges from 0 to 20. It would be inaccurate to merely multiply a Moroccan grade by a factor 5 to find its Canadian or USA equivalent. A score of 20 signifies perfection and is virtually never given. Scores of 19 and 18 are equally rarely given. Depending on the subject and level, a 16 is an excellent grade. In yet other circumstances, a 12 may also be considered as an excellent grade, this especially so when it comes to the Social Sciences or humanities. 
Theoretically, an average student was rated 11/20; a brilliant student scored - 15/20. Most of the academic institutions had an average grade below 10; grades over 12/20 rated the best 10% to 15% of the class. 

In many systems, the full scale of grades is divided not only between pass and fail, but into various "classes" or "categories" corresponding to broad "quality labels" assigned to a certain bracket of numerical grades. Thus, in the United Kingdom, there are "First Class," "Second Class" (divided between upper and lower sub-classes) and "Third Class" performers, while French, German or Spanish students may be labeled in a similar way as, for example, Passable (Average), Gut (Good) or Sobresaliente (Outstanding).
The meaning of these labels in their own context is tainted by culture and tradition. Thus, a British "Third Class" (a pass mark, but usually given only to a relatively small number of very borderline students) is very different from a Moroccan Passable (a widely used label that normally applies to the vast majority of pass grades). However tempting it may be, equating "passable" with "Third Class" because they both correspond to the lowest label of "pass grades" would fail to take into account their real meaning.

As a consequence, conversion scales should pay considerable attention to categories/classes of grades. A first priority should be to make certain that this core piece of information is correctly rendered when converting foreign grades; fine-tuning within each particular class/category is only a subordinate exercise: what matters in Britain is whether the grade is a "First" or not, not whether it is a 71 or a 72. This observation is particularly relevant when converting grades from systems using a broad numerical scale into, for example, the U.S. system which usually has only three pass grades (or categories) corresponding to the letters A, B, and C. In the United States, a "D" may also be considered a passing grade, but not for transfer purposes.
The need to pay attention to grade classes reinforces the conclusion that linear methods, which ignore class boundaries, are nothing but fallacious and dangerous oversimplifications. They distort the original message in the same way as a word-for-word check in a bilingual dictionary: for each word there is a corresponding word in the other language, but the sequence of words thus obtained almost certainly means something different (or nothing at all) in the target language.

Mathematical Formulas Fail to Capture the Message
Both in Europe and in the United States, there have been numerous recent attempts to put together automatic, mathematical formulas that "calculate" foreign grades in the national grading system of the user. However, these formulas do not produce figures that are a reliable and fair reflection of the message conveyed by the original grade. Their main shortfall is that they cannot adequately deal with certain key characteristics of grading systems:
• Grading systems are not linear and are often characterized by a strongly skewed distribution of grades actually given to students. While American or Italian teachers would use the upper part of their grading scales (albeit in different ways), others (e.g., French and British) in practice hardly ever use the top 20% of their scale. For this reason, proposals based on linear formulas can produce devastating results: I recently saw the case of a German student in France who achieved a 15 (quite a good grade) which was converted into a German 2.5 (a rather mediocre one); on the contrary, a British student who gets a 27/30 in Italy would have every reason to be pleased if that grade were linearly calculated to correspond to a British 90/100!
• Many grading systems are not continuous but divided into several "classes" or "categories" which correspond to broad levels of performance. This means that a small difference in numbers may conceal a substantial difference in meaning when a "class" limit is crossed: in the United Kingdom, a grade of 70 classified as "First Class" is very different from a 69 ("Second Class"), while the same small difference of 1 point is irrelevant between the grades of 54 and 55 (both "Lower Second Class").

• Grading differs not only between countries, but there are, as well, marked differences in grading traditions and policies depending on the type and level of the grading institution, the field of
study, or even the type of grade (final examination, mid-term, paper, or average computed from various grade items).

Taking France as an example, it is well known that grades at "classes préparatoires," which recruit among the best students on their way to "Grandes Ecoles," tend to be particularly low, with, for example, 11/20 seen as quite a strong grade, while the pass mark in France is usually an average of 10/20 calculated on all subjects. There may also be minimum pass grades per subject set at a lower level, for example, 8/20. 
The distribution of grades tends to be different between certain quantitative fields (with grades distributed over the whole range) and the non-quantitative fields (where grades are more concentrated in the middle, and the upper part of the scale is seldom used). Thus, even within a given country, a grade may have a "normal," intuitive, abstract meaning which needs to be adjusted (up or downwards) depending on a whole series of factors relating both to who gave it and who interprets it.
From the above observations, my main conclusion is that foreign grades are not just numbers that can be calculated by applying a mathematical formula, but a message that needs first to be understood in the original system and in a second stage interpreted by users in their own system.

Simple mathematical formulas with their claim to universality are nothing but a fallacious oversimplification of a reality they fail to capture
This, however, does not mean that the process of foreign grade interpretation cannot be organized in an efficient, expedient way based on a thorough effort to understand the message that [foreign grades] carry. It is possible to draw up tables ("grade equivalence chart," "grade concordance scale") that render a grade's "normal" or "average" meaning in another grading system, first on a bilateral basis and then in a more multi-lateral context. But this exercise has more to do with the complexity of human language than with mathematics. It takes more listening, modesty and flexibility rather than a doctrinal attitude and a creed in universal formulas/answers. More specifically, the drawing up of tables that can genuinely serve as a basis for interpreting foreign grades is only possible if a certain number of key considerations are observed. The remainder of the article presents six principles that could guide future developments in the area of foreign grade handling.

Notes

References
https://books.google.com/books?id=DXsF7fT318QC&
https://web.archive.org/web/20081221120451/http://www.experienceittours.com/moroccoeducation.html
https://web.archive.org/web/20090103161709/http://www.britishcouncil.org/eumd-information-background-morocco.htm

Morocco
Education in Morocco
Grading